The stroma of the ovary is a unique type of connective tissue abundantly supplied with blood vessels, consisting for the most part of spindle-shaped stroma cells. These appear similar to fibroblasts. The stroma also contains ordinary connective tissue such as reticular fibers and collagen. Ovarian stroma differs from typical connective tissue in that it contains a high number of cells. The stoma cells are distributed in such a way that the tissue appears to be whorled.  Stromal cells associated with maturing follicles may acquire endocrine function and secrete estrogens.  The entire ovarian stroma is highly vascular.

On the surface of the organ this tissue is much condensed, and forms a layer (tunica albuginea) composed of short connective-tissue fibers, with fusiform cells between them.

The stroma of the ovary may contain interstitial cells resembling those of the testis.

See also 
 stroma (disambiguation)
 Stromal cell
 Sex cord-gonadal stromal tumour

References

External links 
 

Mammal female reproductive system